The Canadian city of Vancouver hosts three film festivals:
 Vancouver Asian Film Festival, founded in 1996 and held annually in November
 Vancouver International Film Festival, founded in 1982 and held annually September/October
 Vancouver Queer Film Festival, founded in 2004 and held annually in August

See also
 List of festivals in Vancouver
 Vancouver Web Series Festival, founded in 2013 and held annually in March